Emmanuel Simon (born 25 December 1992) is a Papua New Guinean footballer who plays as a midfielder for Lae City FC in the Papua New Guinea National Soccer League.

International career

International goals
Scores and results list Papua New Guinea's goal tally first.

References

1992 births
Living people
Hekari United players
Papua New Guinean footballers
Association football midfielders
Papua New Guinea international footballers
2016 OFC Nations Cup players